Ronald Ray Howard (July 22, 1973 – October 6, 2005) was a convicted American murderer executed by lethal injection by the U.S. state of Texas. He was convicted of the shooting death of Texas Highway Patrol Trooper Bill Davidson after Howard was stopped for a broken headlight on April 11, 1992.

Life
Born in Houston, Texas, Howard dropped out of school in the 8th grade. By age 15, he was stealing cars and dealing drugs. He started, but never finished training in electrician, building maintenance, computer data entry, and heavy diesel mechanics. He was married with three daughters and one son.

Howard's prior criminal convictions were burglary of a motor vehicle (6-year probated sentence) and theft for which he received a 45-day jail sentence. At the time of the crime,  Howard was 19 years old and on probation.

Crime
On April 11, 1992, Trooper Bill Davidson stopped Howard, originally from the South Park area of Houston, Texas, on U.S. Highway 59 about 5 miles (8 km) south of Edna, Texas in a 1986 GMC Jimmy, as his vehicle had a broken headlight. When Davidson approached the driver-side window of the car, he was shot in the neck. Howard drove off but was apprehended later in the night, with a 9 mm pistol. The car was later found to be stolen. Three days later, Davidson died of his injuries. Drug tests showed that Howard had cocaine and cannabis in his system at the time of the murder.

Howard also said that the rap music that he listened to had conditioned him to hate police officers. He had been listening to 2Pac's "Soulja's Story" when pulled over. The song talks about the harsh life of a young black male being pulled over by a police officer and then shooting him.

Sentencing
On June 8, 1993, Howard was convicted of capital murder and just over a month later sentenced to death. On December 18, 1996, however, the Texas Court of Criminal Appeals overturned the sentence (but not the conviction) because a prospective juror had been erroneously dismissed. The appeals court ordered a new punishment trial, which took place on January 26, 1999; the new trial again sentenced Howard to death. This new sentence was confirmed by the Court of Criminal Appeals on December 19, 2001. On March 30, 2005 after appealing to the Supreme Court of the United States, the Court of Appeals for the Fifth Circuit and the District Court for the Southern District of Texas his execution date was set as October 6.

According to the National Coalition to Abolish the Death Penalty, Howard continued to regret his actions and worked to stop at-risk youth following his lead.

Death
Howard was executed by lethal injection on October 6, 2005 in Huntsville, Texas.

When asked by the warden if he had a final statement, he looked at the family of Davidson and said:
"Yes sir, I do. To the victim's family, I hope it helps a little. I do not know how, but I hope it helps."
He then looked at his family and friends and said: "I love you all, all of you. You know I love you. Thank you for bringing my children back to my life. Thank you. I love you all. I love you all very much. Thank you very much."

Howard was pronounced dead at 6:24 p.m.

See also
 Capital punishment in Texas
 Capital punishment in the United States
 List of people executed in Texas, 2000–2009
 List of people executed in the United States in 2005

References
Notes

Sources
The webpage of Ron R. Howard
Media Advisory: Ronald Ray Howard Scheduled For Execution from the Attorney General of Texas
National Coalition to Abolish the Death Penalty
Appeal to the U.S. District Court for the Southern District of Texas (PDF)

 Offender Information. Texas Department of Criminal Justice. Retrieved on 2007-11-15.
 Last Statement. Texas Department of Criminal Justice. Retrieved on 2007-11-15.
 Ronald Ray Howard. The Clark County Prosecuting Attorney. Retrieved on 2007-11-15.

1973 births
2005 deaths
21st-century executions by Texas
American people convicted of murder
Anti-police violence in the United States
Executed African-American people
People convicted of murder by Texas
People executed for murder
21st-century executions of American people
People from Houston
People executed by Texas by lethal injection
Executed people from Texas
21st-century African-American people